Condon (Irish Condún) is a surname that originated in Ireland, and now most common in counties Cork, Limerick and Tipperary. The name is derived from the Anglo-Norman name de Caunteton, which came to Ireland in the 12th Century with the invader Nicholas de Caunteton.

List of people surnamed Condon

Surnames of Irish origin
Surnames of British Isles origin